Austroboletus neotropicalis is a bolete fungus found in Costa Rica, where it grows under oak.

References

External links

neotropicalis
Fungi described in 1991
Fungi of Central America